Sasha Mehmedovic is a Canadian judoka. At the 2012 Summer Olympics he competed in the Men's 66 kg, but was defeated in the second round.

Portrait
In 2010 the Portrait Society of Canada held a month-long exhibition at the John B. Aird Gallery in Toronto, titled "Canadian Olympic Athletes: a Dialogue in Art", that featured portraits of Canadian Olympic athletes painted by members of the Society. One of the portraits, painted with oil by Society founder and president Veronica Kvassetskaia-Tsyglan, is of Mehmedovic.

See also
 Judo in Ontario
 Judo in Quebec
 Judo in Canada
 List of Canadian judoka

References

External links
 
 
 

Canadian male judoka
Living people
Olympic judoka of Canada
Serbian emigrants to Canada
Judoka at the 2008 Summer Olympics
Judoka at the 2012 Summer Olympics
1985 births
Sportspeople from Pančevo
Sportspeople from Montreal
Canadian people of Serbian descent